Aechmea orlandiana is species in the genus Aechmea endemic to Brazil. The plant was originally collected by the family of Mulford B. Foster in 1939 in Espírito Santo, Brazil, and described by in 1941 L. B. Smith. He named it for the city of Orlando, Florida, based upon it being the Foster's adopted home town, and the orange bracts and white flowers also being the city colors of Orlando.

The following subspecies are recognized:
Aechmea orlandiana subsp. belloi E.Pereira & Leme (1986) 
Aechmea orlandiana subsp. orlandiana

Cultivars 
Cultivars include:
Aechmea 'Belizia'
Aechmea 'Bert'
Aechmea 'Big Beauty'
Aechmea 'Big Ben'
Aechmea 'Bittersweet'
Aechmea 'Black Bands'
Aechmea 'Black Beauty'
Aechmea 'By Golly'
Aechmea 'Charlie'
Aechmea 'Cloudburst'
Aechmea 'Ensign'
Aechmea 'First Joy'
Aechmea 'Foster's Freckles'
Aechmea 'Gold Tone'
Aechmea 'Haiku'
Aechmea 'Hayward'
Aechmea 'Inky'
Aechmea 'Jean Merkel'
Aechmea 'Little Bert'
Aechmea 'Medio Picta'
Aechmea 'Muelleri'
Aechmea 'Rainbow'
Aechmea 'Tiger'
Aechmea 'White Knight'

References

External links

Aechmea orlandiana photo

orlandiana
Flora of Brazil
Plants described in 1941